The instep borer was a putative medieval German instrument of torture that externally resembled an iron boot.  It was hinged to permit the free insertion and removal of the bare foot. A crank projected from a housing over the instep, which concealed a long, thick, serrated iron blade, grooved so as to inflict maximum damage and promote liberal blood flow. 

Turning the crank slowly advanced the blade into the boot, punching a hole through the center of the instep. The resulting wound was so large that it was not unusual for the prisoner to die of toxaemia soon after.

It is likely that, like the "Iron maiden of Nuremberg," or Eiserne Jungfrau, the instep borer is more reflective of myth than of reality.  The only standard source that mentions it, which the Library of Congress attributes to Richard Sair--even though that author's name appears nowhere on the work--claims to be based upon the Earl of Shrewsbury's exhibit of devices from the Royal Castle of Nuremberg that traveled the world after 1890.  Yet, the catalogue that fully annotates the earl's collection of more than one thousand pieces--including dozens of "feet squeezers [and] iron boots" that variously and ingeniously tortured the foot and leg with screws, cranks, wedges, burs, spikes, teeth, red-hot coals, fire, etc.--makes no mention whatsoever of the instep borer.  Even so, hammering an iron spike through a sensitive body part such as the foot, hand, or tongue was a recorded form of punishment in the Middle Ages.

References

Medieval instruments of torture
European instruments of torture